Davao del Norte's 1st congressional district is one of the two congressional districts of the Philippines in the province of Davao del Norte. It has been represented in the House of Representatives since 1987. The district covers the northern and eastern parts of the province including its capital, Tagum, and the municipalities of Asuncion, Kapalong, New Corella, San Isidro and Talaingod. Prior to redistricting in 1998, the district covered much of the Compostela Valley in what is now the province of Davao de Oro. It is currently represented in the 19th Congress by Pantaleon Alvarez of the Partido para sa Demokratikong Reporma (Reporma).

Representation history

Election results

2022

2019

2016

2013

2010

See also
Legislative districts of Davao del Norte

References

Congressional districts of the Philippines
Politics of Davao del Norte
1987 establishments in the Philippines
Congressional districts of the Davao Region
Constituencies established in 1987